Methysia is a genus of moths in the subfamily Arctiinae. The genus was erected by Arthur Gardiner Butler in 1876.

Species
 Methysia melanota Hampson, 1909
 Methysia notabilis Walker, 1854

Former species
 Methysia aenetus Schaus, 1896

References

External links

Arctiinae